The Wappinger were an Eastern Algonquian Munsee-speaking Native American people from what is now southern New York and western Connecticut.

At the time of first contact in the 17th century they were primarily based in what is now Dutchess County, New York, but their territory included the east bank of the Hudson in what became both Putnam and Westchester counties south to the western Bronx and northern Manhattan Island. To the east they reached to the Connecticut River Valley, and to the north the Roeliff Jansen Kill in southernmost Columbia County, New York, marked the end of their territory.

Their nearest allies were the Mohican to the north, the Montaukett to the southeast on Long Island, and the remaining New England tribes to the east.  Like the Lenape, the Wappinger were highly decentralized as a people. They formed numerous loosely associated bands that had established geographic territories.

The Wequaesgeek, a Wappinger people living along the lower Hudson River near today's New York City, were among the very first to be recorded encountering European adventurers and traders when Henry Hudson's Half Moon appeared in 1609.

Long after their original settlements had been decimated by wars with the colonists, wars with other Indian tribes, questionable land sales, waves of diseases brought by the Europeans, and absorption into other tribes, their last sachem and a group of their heavily dwindled people were residing at the "prayer town" sanctuary of Stockbridge, Massachusetts.  A stalwart spokesman for Native American concerns and valiant soldier, Daniel Nimham had traveled to Great Britain in the 1760s to argue for a return of tribal lands, and served in both the French and Indian Wars (on behalf of the English) and American Revolution (in support of the Colonists).  He died with his son Abraham in a slaughter of the Stockbridge Militia at the Battle of Kingsbridge in 1778.

Following the war, what was left of a combined Mohican and Wappinger community in Stockbridge, Massachusetts left for Oneida County in western New York to join the Oneida people there.  There they were joined by the remnants of the Munsee, forming the Stockbridge-Munsee tribe.

From that time the Wappinger ceased to have an independent name in history, and their people intermarried with others.  Their descendants were subsequently relocated to a Stockbridge-Munsee reservation in Shawano County, Wisconsin. The tribe operates a casino there, and in 2010 was awarded two tiny parcels suitable for casinos in New York State in return for dropping larger land claims there.

The totem (or emblem) of the Wappinger was the “enchanted wolf”, with the right paw raised defiantly. By one account they shared this totem with the Mohicans.

Name
The origin of the name Wappinger is unknown. While the present-day spelling was used as early as 1643, countless alternate phonetic spellings were also used by early European settlers well into the late 19th century. Each linguistic group tended to transliterate Native American names according to their own languages. Among these spellings and terms are:

Wappink, Wappings, Wappingers, Wappingoes, Wawpings, Pomptons, Wapings, Opings, Opines, Massaco, Menunkatuck, Naugatuck, Nochpeem, Wangunk Wappans, Wappings, Wappinghs, Wapanoos, Wappanoos, Wappinoo, Wappenos, Wappinoes, Wappinex, Wappinx, Wapingeis, Wabinga, Wabingies, Wapingoes, Wapings, Wappinges, Wapinger and Wappenger.

Anthropologist Ives Goddard suggests the Munsee language-word wápinkw, used by the Lenape and meaning "opossum", might be related to the name Wappinger. No evidence supports the folk etymology of the name coming from a word meaning "easterner," as suggested by Edward Manning Ruttenber in 1906 and John Reed Swanton in 1952.

Others suggest that Wappinger is anglicized from the Dutch word wapendragers, meaning "weapon-bearers", alluding to the warring relationship between the Dutch and the Wappinger.  Such reference would correspond to a first appearance in 1643. This was thirty-four years after the Dutch aboard Hudson's Half Moon may have learned the name the people called themselves. The 1643 date reflects a period of great conflict with the natives, including the preemptive Pavonia massacre by the Dutch, which precipitated Kieft's War.

Language

The Wappinger were most closely related to the Munsee, a large subgroup of the Lenape people. All three were among the Eastern Algonquian-speaking subgroup of the Algonquian peoples. They spoke using very similar Lenape languages, with the Wappinger dialect most closely related to the Munsee language.

Their nearest allies were the Mohican to the north, the Montaukett to the southeast on Long Island, and the remaining New England tribes to the east.  Like the Lenape, the Wappinger were highly decentralized as a people. They formed approximately 18 loosely associated bands that had established geographic territories.

History
The Wappinger were omnivorous, living in seasonal camps where they hunted game, fished the rivers and streams, collected shellfish, and gathered fruits, flowers, seeds, roots, nuts and honey. Practicing seasonal agriculture, they grew corn, beans, and various species of squash. By the time of contact first with Europeans in 1609, their settlements included camps along the major rivers between the Hudson and Housatonic, with larger villages located at the river mouths. Settlements near fresh water and arable land could remain in one location for about twenty years, until the people moved to another place some miles away. Despite many references to their villages and other site types by early European explorers and settlers, few contact-period sites have been identified in southeastern New York (Funk 1976).

European relations
The first contact with Europeans came in 1609, when Henry Hudson's expedition reached this area on the Half Moon. The total population of the Wappinger people at that time has been estimated at between 3,000 and 13,200 individuals.

Robert Juet, an officer on the Half Moon, provides an account in his journal of some of the lower Hudson Valley Native Americans. In his entries for September 4 and 5, 1609, he says:
"This day the people of the country came  of us, seeming very glad of our , and brought  tobacco, and gave us of it for knives and beads. They  in  skins loose, well dressed. They have yellow copper. They desire , and are very ...They have great store of maize or Indian  whereof they make good bread. The country is full of great and tall .

They had red copper  pipes and other things of copper they did wear about their . At night they went on land , so wee rode very quite, but durst not trust them" (Juet 1959:28).

Dutch navigator and colonist David Pieterz De Vries recorded another description of the Wappinger who resided around Fort Amsterdam:

"The Indians about here are tolerably stout, have black hair with a long, lock which they let hang on one side of the head. Their hair is shorn on the top of the head like a cock's comb. Their clothing is a coat of beaver skins over the body, with the fur inside in winter and outside in summer; they have, also, sometimes a bear's hide, or a coat of the skins of wild cats, or  [probably raccoon], which is an animal most as hairy as a wild cat, and is also very good to eat. They also wear coats of turkey feathers, which they know how to put together. Their pride is to paint their faces strangely with red or black lead, so that they look like fiends. Some of the women are very well featured, having long countenances. Their hair hangs loose from their head; they are very foul and dirty; they sometimes paint their faces, and draw a black ring around their eyes."

As the Dutch began to settle in the area, they pressured the Connecticut Wappinger to sell their lands and seek refuge with other Algonquian-speaking tribes.  The western bands, however, stood their ground amidst rising tensions.

Following the Pavonia massacre by colonists, during Kieft's War in 1643, the remaining Wappinger bands united against the Dutch, attacking settlements throughout New Netherland. The Dutch responded with the March 1644 slaughter of between 500 and 700 members of Wappinger bands in the Pound Ridge Massacre, most burned alive in a surprise attack upon their sacred wintering ground.  It was a severe blow to the tribe.

Allied with their trading partners, the powerful Mohawk of the Iroquois nations in central and western New York, the Dutch defeated the Wappinger by 1645.  The Mohawk and Dutch killed more than 1500 Wappinger during the two years of the war. This was a devastating toll for the Wappinger.

The Wappinger faced the Dutch again in the 1655 Peach Tree War, a three-day engagement which left an estimated 100 settlers and 60 Wappinger dead, and strained relations further between the two groups. After the war, the confederation broke apart, and many of the surviving Wappinger left their native lands for the protection of neighboring tribes, settling in particular in the "prayer town" Stockbridge, Massachusetts in the western part of the colony, where Natives had settled who had converted to Christianity.

In 1765, the remaining Wappinger in Dutchess County sued the Philipse family for control of the Philipse Patent land but lost.  In the aftermath the Philipses raised rents on the European-American tenant farmers, sparking colonist riots across the region.

In 1766 Daniel Nimham, last sachem of the Wappinger, was part of a delegation that traveled to London to petition the British Crown for land rights and better treatment by the American colonists. Britain had controlled former "Dutch" lands in New York since 1664. Nimham was then living in Stockbridge, but he was originally from the Wappinger settlement of Wiccopee, New York, near the Dutch-founded settlement of Fishkill on the Hudson. He argued before the royal Lords of Trade, who were generally sympathetic to his claims, but did not arrange for the Wappinger to regain any land after he returned to North America.

The Lords of Trade reported that there was sufficient cause to investigate 
"frauds and abuses of Indian lands...complained of in the American colonies, and in this colony in particular." And that, "the conduct of the lieutenant-governor and the council...does carry with it the colour of great prejudice and partiality, and of an intention to intimidate these Indians from prosecuting their claims."

Upon a second hearing before New York Provincial Governor Sir Henry Moore and the council, John Morin Scott argued that legal title to the land was only a secondary concern. He said that returning the land to the Indians would set an adverse precedent regarding other similar disputes. Nimham did not give up the cause.  When the opportunity to serve with the Continental Army in the American Revolution arose, he chose it over the British in the hopes of receiving fairer treatment by the American government in its aftermath.  It was not to be.

In the American Revolution
Many Wappinger served in the Stockbridge Militia during the American Revolution. Nimham, his son and heir Abraham, and some forty warriors were killed or mortally wounded in the Battle of Kingsbridge in the Bronx on August 30, 1778. It proved an irrevocable blow to the tribe, which had also been decimated by European diseases.

Decline
Following the war, what was left of a combined Mohican and Wappinger community in Stockbridge, Massachusetts left for Oneida County in western New York to join the Oneida people there.  There they were joined by the remnants of the Munsee, forming the Stockbridge-Munsee tribe.

From that time the Wappinger ceased to have an independent name in history, and their people intermarried with others. A few scattered remnants still remained. As late as 1811, a small band was recorded as having a settlement on a low tract of land by the side of a brook, under a high hill in the northern part of the Town of Kent in Putnam County.

Later in the early 19th century, the Stockbridge-Munsee in New York were forced to remove to Wisconsin. Today, members of the federally recognized Stockbridge-Munsee Nation reside mostly there on a reservation, where they operate a casino. In 2010 the tribe was awarded two tiny parcels suitable for casinos in New York State in return for dropping larger land claims there.

Bands

While Edward Manning Ruttenber suggested in 1872 that there had been a Wappinger Confederacy, as did anthropologist James Mooney in 1910, Ives Goddard contests their view. He writes that no evidence supports this idea.

The suggested bands of the Wappinger, headed by sachems, have been described as including:

Wappinger (proper) 
Wappinger who lived on the east side of the Hudson River in present-day Dutchess County, New York

Hammonasset
Hammonasset, an eastern group at the mouth of the Connecticut River, in present-day Middlesex County, Connecticut

Kitchawank
 Kitchawank, lived in northern Westchester County, New York in the area of Croton-on-Hudson, New York, site of the oldest oyster-shell middens found on the North Atlantic Coast. There they built a large, fortified village, called Navish, at the neck of Croton Point.

Massaco
Massaco, along the Farmington River in Connecticut

Nochpeem
Nochpeem, in southern portions of present-day Dutchess and western and northern Putnam counties, New York.  Their tribal fire at one point was in Kent.

Paugusset
Paugusset, along the Housatonic River, present-day eastern Fairfield and western New Haven counties of Connecticut

Podunk
Podunk, east of the Connecticut River in eastern Hartford County, Connecticut

Poquonock
Poquonock, western present-day Hartford County, Connecticut

Quinnipiac
Quinnipiac, in central New Haven County, Connecticut
 The Menunkatuck, were a sub-group of the Quinnipiac, living along the coast in present-day in Guilford in New Haven County, Connecticut.

Sicaog
Sicaog, in present-day Hartford County, Connecticut

Sintsink
Sintsink, also Sinsink, Sinck Sinck, and Sint Sinck, origin of the name of the penitentiary Sing Sing in Ossining, east of the Hudson River in present-day Westchester County, New York

Siwanoy
Siwanoy, southeast coastal Bronx as far as Hell Gate, and interior southernmost Westchester County, New York, into southwestern Fairfield County, Connecticut at the Five Mile River.

Tankiteke
Tankiteke, also "Pachami" and "Pachani", central coastal and extreme western Fairfield County, Connecticut, north to Danbury, north and west into northern Westchester County, New York, eastern Putnam County, New York and southeastern Dutchess County, New York

Tunxis
Tunxis, Farmington, in southwestern Hartford County, Connecticut

Wangunk
 Wangunk, also sometimes called the "Mattabesset", they lived in the Mattabesset area in central Connecticut. Originally located around Hartford and Wethersfield, but were displaced by settlers and relocated to land around the oxbow bend in the Connecticut River.

Wecquaesgeek 
Wecquaesgeek (Wiechquaeskeck, Wickquasgeck, Weckquaesgeek), southwestern Westchester County, New York, originally centered on the mouth of the Saeck Kill in today's Yonkers, and ranging south into the western Bronx along the Hudson and Harlem rivers.  Had hunting grounds on the northern three-quarters of Manhattan Island, and ranged north to present-day Tarrytown and Pocantico Hills.

Legacy

The Wappinger are the namesake of several areas in New York, including:
 Town of Wappinger
 Village of Wappingers Falls
 Wappinger Creek
 Wappinger Trail, Briarcliff Manor, New York
Broadway in New York City also follows their ancient trail.

Notes

References

Bibliography

 
Algonquian ethnonyms
Algonquian peoples
History of Columbia County, New York
History of Dutchess County, New York
Hartford County, Connecticut
History of Fairfield County, Connecticut
Indigenous peoples of the Northeastern Woodlands
Middlesex County, Connecticut
Native American history of Connecticut
Native American history of New York (state)
Native American tribes in Connecticut
Native American tribes in New York (state)
New Haven County, Connecticut
People of New Netherland
Putnam County, New York
Westchester County, New York